The 1940 Minnesota gubernatorial election took place on November 5, 1940. Republican Party of Minnesota candidate Harold Stassen defeated Farmer–Labor Party challenger Hjalmar Petersen.

Results

See also
 List of Minnesota gubernatorial elections

External links
 http://www.sos.state.mn.us/home/index.asp?page=653
 http://www.sos.state.mn.us/home/index.asp?page=657

Gubernatorial
1940
Minnesota
November 1940 events